The Best of Debby Boone (1986) is the first compilation album for Debby Boone, collecting ten tracks from her five secular studio albums released by Curb Records from 1977 to 1981.

Track listing
 "You Light Up My Life" (Joe Brooks) [3:35]
 From You Light Up My Life
 No. 1 (Hot 100), No. 4 (Country), No. 1 (AC)
 "Everybody's Somebody's Fool" (Howard Greenfield, Jack Keller) [2:22]
 1979 single - first album release
 No. 48 (Country)
 "Baby I'm Yours" (Van McCoy) [2:36]
 From You Light Up My Life
 Flip (Hot 100), No. 33 (Country), No. 18 (AC)
 "God Knows" (Franne Golde, Peter Noone, Allee Willis) [3:25]
 From Midstream
 No. 74 (Hot 100), No. 22 (Country), No. 14 (AC)
 "When You're Loved" (Richard M. Sherman, Robert B. Sherman) [3:26]
 From Midstream
 No. 48 (AC)
 "Are You on the Road to Lovin' Me Again" (Debbie Hupp, Bob Morrison) [2:30]
 From Love Has No Reason
 No. 1 (Country), No. 31 (AC)
 "My Heart Has a Mind of Its Own" (Howard Greenfield, Jack Keller) [2:24]
 From Debby Boone
 No. 11 (Country)
 "Free to Be Lonely Again" (Diane Pfeifer) [2:46]
 From Love Has No Reason
 No. 14 (Country)
 "Perfect Fool" (Diane Pfeifer) [2:17]
 From Savin' It Up
 No. 23 (Country), No. 37 (AC)
 "I'll Never Say 'Goodbye'" (Theme From The Universal Picture The Promise) (Alan Bergman, Marilyn Bergman, David Shire) [4:15]
 From Debby Boone

Production credits
Art direction
Katherine DeVault
Simon Levy

Mastering
Steve Hall

Co-ordination
Marguerite Luciani

References

1986 compilation albums
Debby Boone albums
Albums produced by Brooks Arthur